Grimsby Priory, also known as Grimsby Nunnery and St. Leonard's Priory, was an Augustinian nunnery in Lincolnshire, England. It was founded before 1184, and dissolved in 1539.

References

Monasteries in Lincolnshire
Nunneries in England